Wayne Ferreira and Piet Norval were the defending champions, but lost in the semifinals this year.

Ken Flach and Todd Witsken won the title, defeating Kent Kinnear and Sven Salumaa 6–4, 6–3 in the final.

Seeds

  Grant Connell /  Glenn Michibata (third round)
  Scott Davis /  David Pate (second round)
  Ken Flach /  Todd Witsken (champions)
  Tom Nijssen /  Cyril Suk (third round)
  Luke Jensen /  Laurie Warder (quarterfinals)
  Kelly Jones /  Rick Leach (second round)
  Wayne Ferreira /  Piet Norval (semifinals)
 N/A
  Sergio Casal /  Emilio Sánchez (second round)
  Javier Frana /  Leonardo Lavalle (third round)
  Steve DeVries /  David Macpherson (third round)
  Hendrik Jan Davids /  Paul Haarhuis (second round)
  Kevin Curren /  Gary Muller (third round)
  Kent Kinnear /  Sven Salumaa (final)
  Stefan Edberg /  Robert Seguso (second round)
  Ronnie Båthman /  Rikard Bergh (semifinals)

Draw

Finals

Top half

Section 1

Section 2

Bottom half

Section 3

Section 4

References

 Main Draw

Men's Doubles
1992 ATP Tour